The Bucks Free Press is a weekly local newspaper, published every Friday and covering the area surrounding High Wycombe, Buckinghamshire, England. It was first published on 19 December 1856. 

It covers news for south Buckinghamshire - focusing primarily on High Wycombe, Amersham, Princes Risborough and Beaconsfield - as opposed to the entire county.

Marlow has its own edition called the Marlow Free Press which has a number of changed pages.

The paper covers local news, features, leisure and sport. The sport section features extensive coverage of Wycombe Wanderers football club who play at Adams Park, High Wycombe.

Alongside the main Bucks Free Press paper, its also publishes an Aylesbury edition and a Chesham and Amersham edition each week.

The fantasy novelist Terry Pratchett started his career as a journalist with the Bucks Free Press in 1965.

In March 2017, the paper appointed the first female editor in its history, Samantha Harman. The current editor is Katie French who oversees Newsquest's Buckinghamshire and Berkshire region as regional editor.

External links
 The Bucks Free Press Website

Newspapers published in Buckinghamshire
Publications established in 1856
1856 establishments in England